The Whiteaves Formation is a geologic formation in British Columbia. It preserves fossils dating back to the Jurassic period.

See also

 List of fossiliferous stratigraphic units in Italy
 Toarcian turnover
 Toarcian formations
Marne di Monte Serrone, Italy
 Calcare di Sogno, Italy
 Sachrang Formation, Austria
 Saubach Formation, Austria
 Posidonia Shale, Lagerstätte in Germany
 Ciechocinek Formation, Germany and Poland
 Krempachy Marl Formation, Poland and Slovakia
 Lava Formation, Lithuania
 Azilal Group, North Africa
 Whitby Mudstone, England
 Fernie Formation, Alberta and British Columbia
 Poker Chip Shale
 Navajo Sandstone, Utah
 Los Molles Formation, Argentina
 Mawson Formation, Antarctica
 Kandreho Formation, Madagascar
 Kota Formation, India
 Cattamarra Coal Measures, Australia

References
 

Geologic formations of Canada
Jurassic British Columbia
Toarcian Stage